Aixe-sur-Vienne is a commune in the Haute-Vienne department in the Nouvelle-Aquitaine region in western France.

History
A merovingian castrum was recorded as being at the confluence of the river. The Château d'Aixe (or "Tour Jeanne d'Albret") was constructed in the 13th century in Aixe-sur-Vienne, controlled by the viscounts of Limoges. It was demolished at the beginning of the 19th century.

Population

See also
Communes of the Haute-Vienne department

References

External links

Official website 

Communes of Haute-Vienne
Limousin